Joseph Martin "Joschka" Fischer (born 12 April 1948) is a German retired politician of the Alliance 90/The Greens. He served as the foreign minister and as the vice-chancellor of Germany in the cabinet of Gerhard Schröder from 1998 to 2005. Fischer has been a leading figure in the German Greens since the 1970s, and according to opinion polls, he was the most popular politician in Germany for most of the Schröder government's duration. Following the September 2005 election, in which the Schröder government was defeated, he left office on 22 November 2005. In September 2010 he supported the creation of the Spinelli Group, a europarliamentarian initiative founded with a view to reinvigorate efforts to federalise the European Union.

Early life
Fischer was born in Gerabronn in Württemberg-Baden, the third child of a butcher, whose family had lived in Budakeszi, Hungary, for several generations. Fischer's family had to leave Hungary in 1946 after it was occupied by the Soviet Union, and ethnic Germans were persecuted and expelled by the authorities. His nickname Joschka is derived from the Hungarian Jóska, diminutive of Joseph (Hungarian József). He was brought up Catholic and served in his childhood as an altar boy in his parish in Oeffingen. Fischer dropped out of high school in 1965, and started an apprenticeship as a photographer, which he quit in 1966. Because Fischer never gained a school-leaving certificate, he never attended a university or a college. He neither did compulsory military service nor the alternative civilian service for conscientious objectors, because he failed his physical examination due to poor eyesight.

Left-wing militant
In 1967, he became active in the German student movement and left-wing movement (post-) 1968 (the so-called Spontis), first in Stuttgart and after 1968 in Frankfurt am Main. For his regular income, Fischer took several low-wage jobs, such as working in a left-wing bookstore in Frankfurt. During this period, he began attending university events, including lectures organized by left-wing revolutionary students by Theodor W. Adorno, Jürgen Habermas and Oskar Negt. He studied the works of Marx, Mao and Hegel and became a member of the militant group, Revolutionärer Kampf (Revolutionary Struggle). Fischer was a leader in several street battles involving the radical Putzgruppe (literally "cleaning squad", with the first syllable being an acronym for Proletarische Union für Terror und Zerstörung, "Proletarian Union for Terror and Destruction"), which attacked a number of police officers. Photos of one such brawl in March 1973, which were later to haunt Fischer, show him clubbing policeman Rainer Marx, to whom he later publicly apologized.

Fischer is a close friend of Daniel Cohn-Bendit, whom he met during that time. In 1971, he began working for the car manufacturer Opel and attempted to organise his fellow workers for the coming communist revolution. (This was not organising on behalf of a regular labour union: the vast majority of Opel's workers had already been organised for decades by IG Metall, the German metalworkers' union.) This resulted in his dismissal from the company after six months. Fischer then continued making a living with unskilled work while continuing his activism. He worked as a taxi driver from 1976 to 1981 and later in a bookstore in Frankfurt.

In the Deutscher Herbst (German autumn) of 1977, Germany was rattled by a series of left-wing terrorist attacks by the Red Army Faction (RAF) and Revolutionary Cells (RZ). According to Fischer's own account, witnessing these events, particularly the kidnapping and murder of Hanns-Martin Schleyer and the Entebbe hijacking, made him renounce violence as a means for political change. Instead, he became involved in the new social movements and later in the newly founded Green Party, mainly in the state of Hesse. Nevertheless, in 1978 he said he did not mourn the killings of Schleyer, Siegfried Buback and Jürgen Ponto by the RAF.

In May 1981, the Hessian Secretary of Commerce Heinz-Herbert Karry was murdered with a firearm that in 1973 had been transported in Fischer's car, along with other weapons stolen from an American army base. Fischer maintained he had given the car to the later terrorist Hans-Joachim Klein solely for the purpose of having Klein fit it with a new engine. Only later had Fischer learned that his car had been used to transport stolen weapons.

As Foreign Minister, Fischer apologised for the violence of his Putzgruppe days, without disassociating himself from the radical movement. Some critics continue to charge that Fischer was the leading figure of a 1976 discussion that led to the use of Molotov cocktails in an upcoming demonstration in support of RAF member Ulrike Meinhof. Fischer was arrested on 14 May 1976 as a suspect in the Molotov cocktail attacks on police, but was released after two days. Fischer stated that he never used Molotov cocktails against the police. The firebombing of policeman Jürgen Weber's police car left Weber with burns over 60% of his body.

Green politician

From 1983 to 1985, Fischer was a member of the Bundestag for the Green party. His stint in federal parliament saw him frequently engage in a frank and confrontational debating style, exemplified by an incident on 18 October 1984, when he addressed Richard Stücklen, then vice president of the parliament, with the words: "If I may say so, Mr. President, you are an asshole" (German: "Mit Verlaub, Herr Präsident, Sie sind ein Arschloch."). In 1985, Fischer became Minister for the Environment in the Landtag of Hesse in the first governmental Red-Green coalition between the Social Democratic Party of Germany (SPD) and the Greens. Fischer caused a stir when he appeared at his oath of office ceremony wearing trainers. These trainers are now part of the shoe collection at the German Leather and Shoe Museum in Offenbach, Hesse.

Fischer also expressed his thoughts very frankly in the periodical of the Hessian Green party "Stichwort Grün". In an interview with Bunte magazine published on 27 July 1989, he rejected German reunification and demanded that the reunification clause be deleted from the preamble to the Basic Law for the Federal Republic of Germany. Even after the growth of the wave of the refugees from East Germany, Fischer on 20 September 1989 demanded that the Federal Republic renounce reunification. In a column for Die Tageszeitung published on 17 November 1989, eight days after the fall of the Berlin Wall, he predicted that reunification would not happen. On 1 October 1990, Fischer said he refused to celebrate reunification.

Fischer was again environment minister in Hessen from 1991 to 1994 and then became co-chairman of the Greens' parliamentary faction in the Bundestag. Fischer was respected for his oratory skills, as well as for his charisma on the political stage. For a large part of the 1990s, with the social democrats languishing in the opinion polls, Fischer's admirers referred to him as the "real" leader of the opposition. He parlayed his clout into political success, as he moved the Greens to the centre ground of German politics, paving the way for their first participation in the nation's federal government.

Foreign Minister

In September 1998, the Social Democratic Party of Germany, led by Gerhard Schröder, defeated the Christian Democratic Union government of Helmut Kohl. The SPD's 41% and the Greens' 7% of the vote set the two parties on a possible path to government through a coalition. Schröder stated his preference for a red-green coalition, as did an overwhelming majority of SPD members. After several weeks of negotiations, a SPD-Green government took power on 27 October 1998, with Fischer appointed as Minister of Foreign Affairs. By 2005, he was the second longest-serving foreign minister in German postwar history (after Hans-Dietrich Genscher).

In mid-April 1999, Germany came up with the first peace plan, when Fischer produced a proposal, notably including Russia, that would have rewarded the beginning of a Yugoslav pullout from Kosovo with a bombing pause. In May 1999, however, an antiwar protester flung a bag of red paint at Fischer during a party convention debating NATO's airstrikes on Yugoslavia in the war over Kosovo; Fischer suffered a perforated eardrum.

In an effort to make it easier for antiwar critics to back Schröder's decision to send German Bundeswehr troops to Afghanistan in 2001, Fischer and Development Minister Heidemarie Wieczorek-Zeul announced a 256 million marks ($115 million) humanitarian-aid package for Afghan refugees. In late 2001, Fischer hosted – under the auspices of the United Nations – a ten-day conference at the German government guesthouse above the Rhine River, where delegates from four Afghan factions signed the Bonn Agreement establishing a transitional government for the country to replace the deposed Taliban regime. At the time, Germany's longstanding links to Afghanistan and its 2001 chairmanship of the Afghanistan Support Group of countries pledging humanitarian and reconstruction aid for the country, were the reasons it was picked to host the meeting.

In September 2001, Fischer summoned Ahmad Azizi, the Iranian ambassador to Germany, for urgent talks after several reformist intellectuals – including Akbar Ganji, Mehrangiz Kar and Ezzatollah Sahabi – were given prison sentences of between four and 10 years for participating in a 2000 academic and cultural conference sponsored by the Heinrich Böll Foundation in Berlin in late 2000.

In 2005, critics charged that Fischer's relaxing of controls on visa regulations for Ukraine, would allow illegal immigrants to enter Germany with fake identities. A parliamentary committee was established to examine the case, and unlike in other such committee hearings, Fischer's statement (and that of other top officials) was shown live on public television. Fischer's appearance before the committee lasted twelve hours. (See German Visa Affair 2005).

Fischer represented the German government at the funeral services for Foreign Minister Anna Lindh of Sweden on 19 September 2003 in Stockholm; Pope John Paul II on 8 April 2005 in Rome; and former UK Foreign Secretary Robin Cook on 12 August 2005 in Edinburgh.

After the defeat of the coalition government in the 2005 election, Fischer announced that he would retire to the backbench. "After 20 years of power, now I want my freedom back", Fischer said. On 13 October 2005, it was announced that Frank-Walter Steinmeier of the SPD would succeed Fischer as foreign minister.

Western Balkans policy
In 1999, Fischer supported German military participation in the Kosovo War. This proved to be a highly controversial position since Fischer's plan not only clashed with the largely pacifist philosophy of The Greens, but because it also supported for the first time since World War II active participation of German soldiers in combat. Fischer justified this military involvement with allegations that Serbia was planning to commit genocide against the Kosovo Albanians.

Fischer represented the German government at the funeral services for Prime Minister Zoran Đinđić of Serbia on 16 March 2003 (alongside Development Minister Heidemarie Wieczorek-Zeul) and President Boris Trajkovski of Macedonia on 5 March 2004 in Skopje.

Transatlantic relations

On fundamental issues like the International Criminal Court, the Kyoto Protocol, and the crisis in the Middle East, Fischer was openly differing with the Bush administration.

In 1999, both Fischer and Justice Minister Herta Däubler-Gmelin appealed for clemency for the LaGrand brothers, two German citizens sentenced to death in Arizona. According to the German government, the LaGrands had been denied their rights as German citizens because prosecutors did not inform the German consulate of the brothers' arrest in 1982 until a decade later. However, both were put to death, one in a cloud of cyanide gas. In response, the European Union submitted an anti-death-penalty resolution to the United Nations Commission on Human Rights.

Although Fischer was in favour of stationing German troops in Afghanistan, he advised chancellor Schröder not to join the war in Iraq. Fischer famously confronted United States Defense Secretary Donald Rumsfeld at the 39th Munich Security Conference in 2003 on the secretary's purported evidence for Iraq's possession of weapons of mass destruction ("Excuse me, I am not convinced").

Middle East policy
Fischer has been criticized for attending a 1969 conference of the Palestine Liberation Organization, where Palestinian leader Yasser Arafat called for an all-out war on Israel "until the end".

During their time in government, both Fischer and Chancellor Gerhard Schröder were widely considered sincerely, if not uncritically, pro-Israeli. In 1999, Fischer led a delegation including European Commissioner Manuel Marín and the European Union's Special Envoy to the Middle East Miguel Ángel Moratinos on a visit to Jerusalem and the Palestinian territories, but also to a range of other countries which have a crucial role in the peace process, including Lebanon, Syria, Jordan and Egypt. By 2001, he emerged as a pivotal figure in the hopes for the Israeli–Palestinian peace process, in part because he helped bring about a lull in the violence after the Dolphinarium discotheque massacre in June 2001. His intervention led to an announced cease-fire arranged by George Tenet, the United States Director of Central Intelligence; Fischer had been in Tel Aviv at the time of the blast. Fischer later brokered a meeting between Arafat and the Israeli foreign minister, Shimon Peres, to discuss how to implement the cease-fire.

In July 2002, Fischer presented a proposal that calls for Arafat to appoint an interim prime minister. After the vote, the proposal said, elected officials could continue democratic reforms leading to a provisional Palestinian state by the end of 2003 and to final borders by 2005. He represented the German government at the funeral services for Arafat on 12 November 2004 in Cairo and at the inauguration of the new Holocaust Memorial Museum at Yad Vashem in March 2005.

European integration
In May 2000, Fischer proposed the creation of a European federation with a directly elected president and parliament sharing real executive and legislative powers. Fischer proposed the eventual enactment of a constitutional treaty that would set out which powers were to be shifted to the new European executive and parliament, and those that remained at national level. In response, President Jacques Chirac of France urged Germany in June 2000 to join France in spearheading a core group of European Union countries that would move faster than others toward political and economic union.

In October 2002, Fischer was appointed by the German government to the Convention on the Future of Europe, replacing Peter Glotz. Fischer had expressed a keen interest in taking part in the convention during the coalition talks with Chancellor Gerhard Schröder following the 2002 elections. In a paper jointly signed by Fischer and French Foreign Minister Dominique de Villepin, in November 2002, Germany and France pushed for a mutual defence commitment to be part of the constitution. In 2004, he was one of the signatories to the Treaty establishing a Constitution for Europe.

Relations with Russia
Fischer has long been critical of Russia, especially on human rights. However, during his time as foreign minister, Germany's relations with Russia were primarily guided by Chancellor Gerhard Schröder. In 2004, Fischer called on Ukraine to hold a recount of the presidential elections after Putin-backed candidate Viktor Yanukovich was the first to declare his victory despite mass protests in Kyiv.

Life after politics

Non-profit work 
From September 2006 until 2007, Fischer was a senior fellow at the Liechtenstein Institute on Self-Determination, and as a visiting professor co-taught with Wolfgang F. Danspeckgruber at Woodrow Wilson School of Public and International Affairs, both at Princeton University. He has also spoken at other American universities on various topics in foreign affairs and international relations.

In addition, Fischer joined various non-governmental organizations, including:
 Arab Democracy Foundation, Founding Member of the Board of Trustees (since 2007)
 Council on Foreign Relations, Member
 European Council on Foreign Relations (ECFR), Founding Co-chairman of the Board (alongside Martti Ahtisaari and Mabel van Oranje)
 United Nations Association of Germany (DGVN), Member of the Presidium
 Institute for Human Sciences (IWM), Member of the Board of Patrons
 Roland Berger Human Dignity Award, Member of the Awards Committee

On 15 September 2010 Fischer supported the new initiative Spinelli Group, which was founded to reinvigorate efforts towards federalisation of the European Union (EU). Other prominent supporters are: Jacques Delors, Daniel Cohn-Bendit, Guy Verhofstadt, Andrew Duff, Elmar Brok.

Business activities 
Since 2008, Fischer has been Senior Strategic Counsel at Albright Stonebridge Group, Washington, DC, consulting firm led by Madeleine Albright. In this capacity, he advised Siemens, BMW and Deutsche Börse.

In 2009, Fischer took a post as adviser to the Nabucco pipeline project, which involved the German RWE company. According to media reports, the "six-digit salary" consultancy contract has already been signed.

Other for-profit activities include:
 Meridiam, Member of the supervisory board (since 2012)
 Tilray, Member of the Advisory Board

Recognition
 2002 – Honorary doctorate of the University of Haifa
 2003 – Buber Rosenzweig Medal (awarded by Paul Spiegel)
 2004 – Gottlieb Duttweiler Prize (awarded by Micheline Calmy-Rey and Jean-Claude Juncker)
 2006 – Honorary doctorate of Tel Aviv University
 2009 – Leo Baeck Medal (awarded by James Wolfensohn and Henry Kissinger)
 2012 – Honorary doctorate, University of Michigan
 2016 – Medal for Extraordinary Merits for Bavaria in a United Europe

Personal life
Prior to the German Visa Affair 2005, Fischer was a popular politician, "loved by an entire nation." Writing in Der Spiegel, journalist Charles Hawley opined that since 1998, "Joschka Fischer's popularity has been virtually unassailable: The icon of the environmentally minded Green Party could, it seemed, do no wrong. Indeed, Fischer was so popular in 2002 that Chancellor Gerhard Schroeder largely based his early election campaign on the fact that Fischer would remain at his side at the helm of Germany's political leadership." As Germany's Foreign Minister, Fischer's popularity soared when he opposed the Iraq War, and his very public struggle with his weight endeared him to many Germans.

Up until 1996, Fischer was a bon vivant, and often spoke openly about his love for good wines and food despite his "chunky" figure. As he ascended to the Foreign Ministry, Fischer decided to lose weight, transforming his body almost overnight by refraining from alcohol and becoming a vegetarian. In 2000, he covered the topic of his weight loss by writing the book My Long Race Towards Myself on his experience, which became an immediate bestseller in Germany.
Half a year before becoming foreign minister, he had his marathon debut at the 1998 Hamburg Marathon (clocking 3:41) As minister, he finished New York in 1999 (3:55) and Berlin in 2000 (3:55)
Afterwards, he reduced training and during the months preceding the Iraq War, Fischer began putting on weight again.

Fischer was married to German-Iranian film producer and screenwriter Minu Barati in 2005. It is his fifth marriage. His two children with his previous partner and eventual wife, Inge Vogel (to whom he was married from 1984 to 1987), were born in 1979 and 1983, respectively. At the time of his wedding with Barati in 2005, she was mother to a six-year-old daughter from a previous relationship, while Fischer's children were 23 and 26 of age at the time. The couple lives with Barati's daughter.

In 2004, he commissioned German heraldist Dieter Krieger to produce a coat of arms, which was registered to the Rhein-Main Wappenrolle. The arms are a type of a "Canting arms"; party per fesse silver and gules, in chief crossed axes with red blades and black handles, in base, a fish in the first. Crest of the red eagle's wings, mantling red doubled silver.

He describes himself as Catholic, but not very religious.

Further reading
 Paul Berman: Idealisten an der Macht. Die Passion des Joschka Fischer. Siedler, München 2006, .
 Jürgen Schreiber: Meine Jahre mit Joschka. Nachrichten von fetten und mageren Zeiten. Econ, Berlin 2007, .
 Christian Y. Schmidt: Wir sind die Wahnsinnigen. Joschka Fischer und seine Frankfurter Gang. Verbrecher Verlag, Berlin 2013.
 Interviews
 Gero von Boehm: Joschka Fischer. 31. August 2010. Interview in: Begegnungen. Menschenbilder aus drei Jahrzehnten. Collection Rolf Heyne, München 2012, S. 678–692

References

External links

Boston Review article reviewing Fischer's biography
Biography at the German Historic Museum 
Photographs of Joschka Fischer 1991 - 1998 at the German Historic Museum 
Joschka Fischer, la retraite ou pas ? 
Joscka Fischer : les discours d’un Vert aux affaires étrangères 
Interview with Joschka Fischer After moving to Princeton University, Fischer gives an in-depth interview about security and globalization for Princeton Report on Knowledge.
Joschka Fischer's monthly syndicated commentary series, "The Rebel Realist", from Project Syndicate

The following sources reflect the views of U.S. adversaries of Fischer and his policies, especially Germany's decision not to participate in the 2003 U.S.-led invasion of Iraq.
Why Germany Isn't Convinced by Paul Berman in Slate
Power and the Idealists : Or, The Passion of Joschka Fischer, and Its Aftermath by Paul Berman.  (Originally appeared as a 25,000 word essay in The New Republic, 3 September 2001)
The last rock 'n' roller of German politics In an interview with the taz given in September 2005, Fischer reflects on what his coming retirement means for his party, his country and himself. At signandsight.com
Joschka Fischer writes a monthly commentary series for Project Syndicate
"The Rebel Realist – Joschka Fischer". Project Syndicate. Archived from the original on 2012-02-05.
"Joschka Fischer" (columnist page). Project Syndicate.

Joschka Fisher speaks to Leadel.NET, an online Jewish media portal, in a video interview
Leadel - Leadership Elements, Jewish Leaders, Jewish Activism

|-

|-

1948 births
Foreign Ministers of Germany
German Roman Catholics
Living people
Members of the Bundestag for Hesse
People from Schwäbisch Hall (district)
People of Hungarian German descent
Princeton University faculty
Recipients of the Order of the Cross of Terra Mariana, 1st Class
Vice-Chancellors of Germany
Members of the Landtag of Hesse
Members of the Bundestag 2005–2009
Members of the Bundestag 2002–2005
Members of the Bundestag 1998–2002
Members of the Bundestag 1994–1998
Members of the Bundestag 1983–1987
Members of the Bundestag for Alliance 90/The Greens